Brett Detar is an American singer, songwriter, film composer, and music producer. He is perhaps best known as frontman for the band The Juliana Theory and as former guitarist in Zao.

Detar launched a career as a singer/songwriter in the Americana and country genre with the release of his debut solo album, Bird in the Tangle.

Life and career 
Brett Detar was born April 30, 1978 in Greensburg, Pennsylvania.

He began his musical career as guitarist in the band Pensive, who released an EP called The Subtlety of Silence and a split with EP with fellow Pennsylvania band Seasons In The Field.

In 1997, drummer Jesse Smith recruited Brett to play guitar in the metalcore band Zao. Detar suggested his friend Dan Weyandt come aboard as well. They both appeared on the groundbreaking album Where Blood and Fire Bring Rest and a split CD with Training for Utopia. In 1998, Detar left Zao to pursue what began as a side-project, The Juliana Theory, full-time.

Following the initial dissolution of The Juliana Theory in 2006, Detar began work on a solo album, which emerged on November 10, 2010 via his website. Bird in the Tangle was supported by a month long tour in 2011, opening for Tiger Army frontman Nick 13. His second solo album, Too Free to Live, followed on October 8, 2013. The same year, he toured the U.S. with Lindi Ortega.

A number of Detar's solo songs have been featured on several television series, including Nashville, Supernatural, Elementary, Jersey Shore, Friendzone,Snooki & Jwoww, Teen Mom, and Party Down South. His songs were also included in episodes of the acclaimed Marvel Television Netflix shows Daredevil, Jessica Jones, and The Punisher.

He made his debut as a film composer with Paramount Pictures The Devil Inside, which opened in North America on January 6, 2012. Detar reunited with writer/director William Brent Bell for FilmDistrict's 2014 action thriller WER, the 2020 horror sequel Brahms: The Boy II and the 2021 horror film, Separation.

Discography

Pensive
The Subtlety of Silence EP (1997)
The Psalms of Ariana split EP with Seasons In the Field (1998)

Zao

Where Blood and Fire Bring Rest (1998)
The Split EP split EP with Training For Utopia (1998)

The Juliana Theory

Understand This Is A Dream (1999)
Emotion is Dead (2000)
Love (2003)
Deadbeat Sweetheartbeat (2005)
A Dream Away (2021)

Brett Detar
Bird in the Tangle (2010) 
Too Free to Live (2013)

Filmography

Composer
The Devil Inside (2012)
WER (2014)
Brahms: The Boy II (2020)
Separation (2021)
Orphan: First Kill (2022)

References

External links

1978 births
Living people
21st-century American composers
21st-century American guitarists
21st-century American male musicians
American film score composers
American heavy metal guitarists
American male film score composers
American male guitarists
Guitarists from Pennsylvania
People from Greensburg, Pennsylvania
Male film score composers
Mind Over Matter Records artists
Musicians from Pittsburgh
Zao (American band) members